Devudu Chesina Manushulu may refer to:

 Devudu Chesina Manushulu (1973 film)
 Devudu Chesina Manushulu (2012 film)
 Devudu Chesina Manushulu (soundtrack)